Ryan Shane Sieg (born June 20, 1987) is an American professional stock car racing driver and team owner. He competes full-time in the NASCAR Xfinity Series, driving the No. 39 Ford Mustang for RSS Racing. He is the younger brother of late former driver Shane Sieg and older brother of current teammate Kyle Sieg.

Racing career

Gander Outdoors Truck Series

Sieg made his NASCAR debut in 2009, competing in the Camping World Truck Series Kroger 250 at Martinsville Speedway. Driving the No. 21 Dodge for GunBroker Racing, Sieg started 16th but finished 34th due to an ignition problem. At The Milwaukee Mile, he would start a partial schedule for his family-owned race team. In nine races, Ryan recorded six top-20 finishes including a finish of 9th at Gateway International Raceway.

For 2010, Sieg and his brother Shane both planned to run the full Truck Series schedule in the No. 39 and No. 93 trucks, respectively.  Despite having no major sponsorship, Sieg was able to run the entire season, finishing 21 of the 25 races and earning two top-10 finishes, including an 8th at Kentucky Speedway and a 9th at Dover International Speedway.

On June 10, 2011, Sieg finished 7th in the WinStar World Casino 400K at Texas Motor Speedway, marking his best career finish in his 44th start in the Camping World Truck Series. He also led ten laps earlier after staying out on a pit stop. At the September 2 Truck Series race at Atlanta Motor Speedway, he piloted his No. 39 RSS Racing Chevy to a 15th-place finish.

For 2012, Sieg led six laps at the Charlotte Motor Speedway race after staying out on a pit stop during a caution. He ran the final three laps in 3rd position before finishing in 15th after running out of fuel on the last lap at Michigan International Speedway on August 18, marking his best final-laps position in the Camping World Truck Series. He would later score a 6th-place finish at Phoenix.

In 2013, in addition to running the full Camping World Truck Series season, Sieg substituted for Jeremy Clements in the NASCAR Nationwide Series during the latter's suspension. Later in the year he ran at the Indianapolis Motor Speedway in the Indiana 250 for his own team.

In 2019, Sieg returned to the Truck Series for the JEGS 200 at Dover, driving the No. 33 Chevrolet for Reaume Brothers Racing. After starting last in 32nd, he finished 16th.

Xfinity Series

In February 2014, RSS Racing announced that Sieg would run the full Truck Series season and at least the first five Nationwide Series races in 2014. He finished in the 9th spot in the season-opening DRIVE4COPD 300 at Daytona International Speedway, his first top 10 in the Nationwide Series. After Fontana, it was announced that Sieg would focus his efforts on the Nationwide Series for the remainder of the season, running for Rookie of the Year. Sieg then earned fame himself at the July race at Daytona when he drafted Kasey Kahne past teammate Regan Smith to his first Nationwide victory since 2007. In doing so, he also scored his first career top 5 finish with a 3rd-place finish, enough to put him in the first of four races in the 2014 Nationwide Dash 4 Cash event the next week at New Hampshire. Sieg was rather impressive in 2014, having some other solid runs to go along with the two top 10s to finish the season 16th in points.

In 2015, Sieg returned to the Xfinity Series with a new sponsor Uncle Bob's Self Storage at the season opener at Daytona. He finished 38th after being involved in the first big one. Sieg had a consistent season with finishing many races under 20th, including an 8th-place finish at Kansas, finishing 11th in points. Sieg lost the sponsorship from Uncle Bob's for 2016 but a number of sponsors filled the void. Some highlights of the season included almost qualifying for the Dash 4 Cash at Dover International Speedway, running in the top five at Daytona International Speedway, and qualifying for the inaugural Xfinity Series Chase before being knocked out after the first round.

In June 2017, Sieg recorded his best career Xfinity finish of second at Iowa Speedway. Later in the season, Sieg's Xfinity throwback car for Darlington Raceway honored Ryan's brother Shane Sieg, who had died two weekends prior.

On January 24, 2018, Sieg announced another full season with RSS Racing. After a sixth-place run at Talladega Superspeedway in the spring, Sieg qualified for the Xfinity Series Dash 4 Cash at Dover International Speedway after Spencer Gallagher's eligibility was stripped. A pit road penalty during the race prevented Sieg from making it any farther in the D4C. Sieg's efforts received a boost in 2018 with the addition of two start and park cars that RSS Racing also fielded to help fund Sieg's efforts in the No. 39.

On December 27, 2018, Sieg announced another full Xfinity season with RSS Racing, intending to make the playoffs for the first time since 2016. After scoring his second top-five of the year at the spring Richmond Raceway event, Sieg sat ninth in the point standings. He credited new crew chief Shane Wilson and new cars from Richard Childress Racing as catalysts for the uptick in performance.

In September 2019, Sieg finished 14th in the Rhino Pro Truck Outfitters 300 at Las Vegas but was disqualified after his car failed post-race inspection for not meeting the minimum ride height. Nevertheless, he qualified for the Xfinity playoffs and the disqualification did not affect his points standing.

After a 2020 season that saw Sieg record a career-best seven top-five finishes and reach the playoffs' Round of 8 before finishing tenth in points, RSS Racing switched to Ford for 2021.

During the spring 2022 Las Vegas race, Sieg lost control of his car and hit the outside wall after light contact from Ty Gibbs. Both drivers discussed the incident during a red flag delay. Once the race resumed, NASCAR black-flagged Sieg for not reaching the minimum speed, but instead of returning to pit road, he attempted to wreck Gibbs, but he ended up spinning and damaging Sheldon Creed and Brett Moffitt's cars before returning to the garage. Following a 10th place finish and accidents to Creed and Landon Cassill at the fall 2022 Bristol race, Sieg was able to advance to the Xfinity Series Playoffs. Despite three Top 10 finishes in the Round of 12, Sieg was eliminated from the Xfinity Playoffs. He would ultimately finish 11th in the points standings.

Cup Series
In May 2017, Sieg was signed by BK Racing to drive their No. 83 Toyota Camry in the Monster Energy NASCAR Cup Series at Dover International Speedway for the AAA 400 Drive for Autism, his MENCS debut. A month later, he replaced Gray Gaulding in BK's No. 23 Camry for the FireKeepers Casino 400 at Michigan.

Two years later, he returned to the Cup Series at Indianapolis Motor Speedway, driving the No. 27 for Premium Motorsports.

Motorsports career results

NASCAR
(key) (Bold – Pole position awarded by qualifying time. Italics – Pole position earned by points standings or practice time. * – Most laps led.)

Monster Energy Cup Series

Xfinity Series

Gander Outdoors Truck Series

 Season still in progress
 Ineligible for series points
 Sieg started the 2014 season running for Truck Series points but switched to Nationwide before Fontana.

References

External links

 
 

Living people
1987 births
Racing drivers from Atlanta
Racing drivers from Georgia (U.S. state)
NASCAR drivers
CARS Tour drivers
People from Tucker, Georgia
American Speed Association drivers
Sportspeople from DeKalb County, Georgia